Royalist refers to a supporter of a particular monarch.

Royalist may also refer to:

Royalist (Spanish American Revolution)
HMS Royalist, several Royal Navy ships
The Royalist, schooner
TS Royalist, sail training ship
Royalists (French Socialist Party), supporters of Ségolène Royal
The Cavaliers, also referred to as the Royalists, the party supporting the King during the English Civil War
A student of Royal College, Colombo